Waterworld is a water park located in Festival Park, Stoke-on-Trent, Staffordshire, England. The park  attracts 400,000 visitors per year. The park first opened in 1989 and is generally open year-round, but is closed for a few days of the week during term time.

History
In 1999 Mo Chaudry's family trust bought Water World from Rank Leisure for £1.5m, at the time the park was operating at a loss. Early in the 21st century WaterWorld began turning profits. In summer 2019, four new rides came to Waterworld as part of their 30th anniversary, and Stormchaser and Hurricane opened on 21 August, while the other two, Thunderbolt and Cyclone, opened a few days later on 24 August. The tallest rides in Tornado Alley overtake the Twister and become the tallest rides in the park.

Rides
The park's rides and attractions include: Thunderbolt, cyclone, hurricane, stormchaser, Black Hole, The Nucleus, Space Bowl, Super Flume, Twister, Python, Rapids, Medium Sized Flumes, Toddler Slides, Bubble Pools, Outdoor Pool (seasonal), Interactive Jungle House, The Lily pads, Racing Slides, Wave Pool, Toddler Slide and the Assault Course.

The Nucleus
The Nucleus is an indoor water rollercoaster which transports the ride participant through 375 feet of ups and downs in a rubber ring. The height limit is 1.1 metres. After the rider climbs the stairs and collects a rubber ring, a lifeguard pushes them off. A blaster boosts them into a tunnel, after which there is a drop to a second blaster and tunnel, and finally a drop to a water blaster which slows the rider down and, if there's a queue, the ring is handed off to another person.The raft you use on the waterslide cannot be used on any tornado alley waterslide.

Space Bowl
The Space Bowl is UFO themed, formed into a spiral leading to a drop into a 2-meter tub of water. It is limited to riders who are strong swimmers because it is possible to drop out of the spiral head first.

Rapids
The rapids is a water-flowing feature in a circle shape.

Twister
The Twister was the tallest flume at Waterworld until 2019 when four new rides (Stormchaser, Hurricane, Cyclone and Thunderbolt) were built for Waterworld's 30th anniversary. Goggles are not permitted to be worn on the ride. After climbing to a high platform, the rider slides down a tube and around corners at fast speed, with mini water effects along the way. The rider creates a wave of water that falls into a pool beneath the exit. At the end a sign asks the rider to hurry to the exit in order to speed up operating times. A skull at the entrance was removed in 2017 speed of 22 Mph.

The Three Flumes
The Three Flumes are the Super Flume, Python and Black Hole. They are next-door to each other and they end up in the same pool. The pool depth is 1.2m.

Tornado Alley
Tornado Alley opened in 2019 (the parks 30th anniversary) and consisted of four new rides: Stormchaser, Hurricane, Cyclone and Thunderbolt. Thunderbolt is the tallest ride you can find in the uk, at a height of 55ft tall. It is also the fastest at 60mph. Another exciting ride in tornado alley is Cyclone. It brings you down a dark tube with light effects, and soon into a cylindrical room. It rocks from side-to-side, until reaching a fast tube, leading into a cyclone, the raft makes a circle around, then soon falls into the middle. This then leads to the end of the waterslide. Hurricane and storm chaser are much more simple, as they are just normal slides; storm chaser with a raft and hurricane without.

References

1989 establishments in England
Buildings and structures in Stoke-on-Trent
Tourist attractions in Staffordshire
Water parks in the United Kingdom
Tourist attractions in Stoke-on-Trent